The Runaway Bus is a 1954 British comedy film produced, written, and directed by Val Guest. It stars Frankie Howerd, Margaret Rutherford and Petula Clark and an ensemble cast of character actors in a story about a bus caught in fog while a gang of crooks tries to carry off a heist. The film was shot at Southall Studios in London with sets designed by the art director Wilfred Arnold. It was the film debut of Belinda Lee. The film is referenced in an episode of Frankie Howerd's 1970s radio series.

Plot
When heavy fog wreaks havoc among air travellers throughout southern England, outspoken Cynthia Beeston (Margaret Rutherford), a forceful proponent of "Positive Thought", insists on being taken from London Airport to Blackbushe Airport, where she might be able to fly to Dublin.

Harassed airline employees find emergency relief coach 13, and reserve driver Percy Lamb (Frankie Howerd) to transport her. Lamb is a man so hapless he cannot find his way around the airport, much less the roads. Beeston is joined by mild-mannered Henry Waterman (Toke Townley), pulp-thriller addict Janie Grey (Belinda Lee) and Ernest Schroeder (George Coulouris). To satisfy a regulation, stewardess "Nikki" Nicholls (Petula Clark) is assigned to shepherd them. Rounding out the party is airline first officer Peter Jones (Terence Alexander), who hitches a ride.

Unbeknownst to most of them, robbers have stolen £200,000 worth of gold bullion from the airport bonded store and hidden the proceeds in the boot of the coach.

Two of the crooks are caught; under questioning by Inspector Henley (John Horsley), one breaks down and admits the gold was stowed on the coach and that the mysterious and notorious "Banker" is the mastermind. Henley informs Percy by radio, but the fog is so thick, Percy has no idea where he is. In mid-call, Peter pokes what Percy thinks is a gun into Percy's back and tells him to keep driving. They wind up at a deserted booby-trapped village used by the Army for training.

When Schroeder finds a Sten gun, Peter grabs it. Schroeder then informs him that it does not work, and produces a pistol of his own. After a scuffle, it turns out that Peter is working for airport security, while Schroeder is a police officer. Miss Beeston - the Banker - ends up with the gun, and her henchman Henry tries to start the coach. Percy saves the day, having removed the rotor arm from the engine, and knocking the pistol out of Miss Beeston's hand with a stone.

Cast
Frankie Howerd as Percy Lamb
Margaret Rutherford as Cynthia Beeston
Petula Clark as Lee "Nikki" Nichols
George Coulouris as Ernest Shroeder
Toke Townley as Henry Waterman
Terence Alexander as Peter Jones
Belinda Lee as Janie Grey
John Horsley as Inspector Henley
Anthony Oliver as Duty official
Stringer Davis as Transport officer
Michael Gwynn as Transport dispatcher
Reginald Beckwith as Telephone man
Marianne Stone as Travel girl
Lionel Murton as American traveller
Lisa Gastoni as Receptionist 
Richard Beynon as Transport officer
Sam Kydd as Airport security officer
Cyril Conway as 1st crook
Arthur Lovegrove as 2nd crook
Alastair Hunter as Detective Spencer

Production
The huge success of Norman Wisdom in Trouble in Store led to British film companies signing up other comics from TV, radio and variety. The company Eros decided to make a film with Frankie Howerd.

Val Guest had first met Frankie Howerd backstage in his dressing room  at the London Palladium where Howerd was topping the bill in a long-running variety show. The two men became friends. Howerd later said he "wanted to do a comedy thriller. Bob  Hope’s first real success was in The Cat and the Canary. I  saw it when I was in the army and thought that if I ever get out I’d make a comedy thriller."

Guest said that Howerd was initially reluctant to make a film, "Films? Oho, that's a dangerous game. Get your name up there outside a cinema and if they don't go in it's all your fault! Thank you but no thank you!" Howerd finally agreed, but made three demands. Firstly, Guest had to write a comedy-thriller, so that if the comedy part did not work, the thriller part might. Second, he did not want his name first above the title. And finally, he wanted his favourite comedy actress Margaret Rutherford to be in it.

Howerd's biographer said that The Runaway Bus "was a kind of a cross between a cut-price version of The Cat and the Canary and a very half-hearted reworking of The Ghost Train" which Guest had helped adapt for Arthur Askey. Shooting took five weeks, with a budget of £45,000. It was made at Southall Studios in London.

In September 1953 the New York Times announced that the film would be called Scream in the Night and star Howerd and Belinda Lee, who the paper said had never acted before and was the seventy-seventh girl who auditioned.
 
Howerd later said Guest "wrote the story but I mostly wrote my own part and we did it. In those days we didn't have much money so in order to make the film... you set the whole thing in a fog so you wouldn't use much scenery. The great advantage was having Margaret Rutherford in it."

On the last day of filming, Guest realised that the movie was coming in at 72 minutes, three minutes short to qualify as a feature, so Howerd improvised a scene in a phone box.

Reception
Variety called it "boisterous". Filmink said " Lee is gorgeous to look at and is quite funny; the film did not turn Howerd into a film star (that came later, off the back of TV success) but it is entertaining."

References

External links
 
The Runaway Bus at BFI
The Runaway Bus at TCMDB

1954 films
1950s crime comedy films
1950s comedy mystery films
British crime comedy films
British comedy mystery films
1950s English-language films
Films about buses
Films directed by Val Guest
Films set in London
Films shot at Southall Studios
1954 comedy films
British black-and-white films
1950s British films